WLHW is a Christian radio station licensed to Casey, Illinois, broadcasting on 91.5 MHz FM.  The station is owned by American Hope Communications.

WLHW was originally owned by Word Power, Inc. In 2021, it was sold to American Hope Communications, along with WKZI, WPFR, WPFR-FM, and three translators, for $179,000.

References

External links

LHW
Moody Radio affiliate stations
Radio stations established in 2006
2006 establishments in Illinois